Stefan Tymkewycz (born Abbeyhill, 18 September 1959) is a Scottish National Party (SNP) politician, and a former Member of the Scottish Parliament (MSP) for the Lothians region. He was elected during the 2007 election for the Lothians region. Tymkewycz is also a former councillor for Craigentinny/Duddingston ward on the City of Edinburgh Council, and agreed not to take his allowance for that job while he was an MSP. Formerly a police officer, he now runs his own property business in Edinburgh.

In August 2007 he announced that he was to step down as an MSP to concentrate on being an Edinburgh councillor and was replaced by Shirley-Anne Somerville in the Scottish Parliament on 31 August 
2007. Tymkewycz stood down as councillor in 2017.

References

External links 
 
 Councillor Stefan Tymkewycz The City of Edinburgh Council

1959 births
Living people
Scottish people of Ukrainian descent
Scottish National Party MSPs
Members of the Scottish Parliament 2007–2011
Councillors in Edinburgh
Politicians from Edinburgh
Scottish National Party councillors